The 2001 Sami parliamentary election was held in Norway on September 10, 2001. Voters elected 39 members for the Sami Parliament of Norway.

Results
Election results for the 2001 Sami parliamentary election. Voter turnout was 66.2%.

See also
2001 Norwegian parliamentary election

References

Sami, 2001
Sámi in Norway
Norway
Sami parliamentary election
Norway
Norwegian Sámi parliamentary elections